Gajanura Gandu  is a 1996 Indian Kannada-language action drama film directed by Anand P. Raju and produced by G. R. Krishna Reddy. The film stars Shiva Rajkumar, Narmada and Jayanthi. The film's score and soundtrack is composed by Sadhu Kokila.

Cast 

 Shiva Rajkumar 
 Narmada
 Jayanthi
 Avinash
 Sadashiva
 Tennis Krishna
 Thriller Manju
 Honnavalli Krishna
 Keerthiraj
 Ashalatha
 Michael Madhu

Soundtrack 
The soundtrack of the film was composed by Sadhu Kokila.

References 

1996 films
1990s Kannada-language films
1990s action drama films
1990s masala films
Indian action drama films
Indian romantic action films
1996 drama films
1990s romantic action films